Below are the results of the first season of the United Kingdom & Ireland Poker Tour (UKIPT).  Currency amounts are in Euro or Pounds Sterling as stated.

Results

UKIPT Galway 
 Venue: Radisson SAS Hotel
 Buy-in: €2,000
 4-Day Event: 11–14 December 2009
 Number of buy-ins: 259
 Total Prize Pool: €471,400
 Number of Payouts: 36

UKIPT Manchester 
 Venue: G Casino 'The Sandcastle', Manchester
 Buy-in: £550
 4-Day Event: 11–14 February 2010
 Number of buy-ins: 518
 Total Prize Pool: £259,000
 Number of Payouts: 72

UKIPT Coventry 
 Venue: G Casino Coventry
 Buy-in: £550
 4-Day Event: 8–11 April 2010
 Number of buy-ins: 368
 Total Prize Pool: £184,000
 Number of Payouts: 45

UKIPT Nottingham 
 Venue: Dusk Til Dawn, Nottingham
 Buy-in: £560
 5-Day Event: 12–16 May 2010
 Number of buy-ins: 650
 Total Prize Pool: £325,000
 Number of Payouts: 72

UKIPT Killarney 
 Venue: Gleneagle Hotel, Killarney
 Buy-in: €1,100
 4-Day Event: 24–27 June 2010
 Number of buy-ins: 253
 Total Prize Pool: €253,000
 Number of Payouts: 32

UKIPT Brighton 
 Venue: Rendezvous Casino, Brighton
 Buy-in: £1,100
 5-Day Event: 15–19 July 2010
 Number of buy-ins: 259
 Total Prize Pool: £259,000
 Number of Payouts: 32

UKIPT Edinburgh 
 Venue: The Corn Exchange, Edinburgh
 Buy-in: £550
 4-Day Event: 19–22 August 2010
 Number of buy-ins: 401
 Total Prize Pool: £200,500
 Number of Payouts: 56

UKIPT Dublin 
 Venue: Burlington Hotel, Dublin
 Buy-in: €560
 4-Day Event: 9–12 September 2010
 Number of buy-ins: 589
 Total Prize Pool: €295,000
 Number of Payouts: 72

UKIPT Grand Final London 
 Venue: Hilton Metropole, London
 Buy-in: £5,250
 5-Day Event: 29 September – 4 October 2010
 Number of buy-ins: 848
 Total Prize Pool: £4,112,800
 Number of Payouts: 128

Notes 

UK and Ireland Poker Tour
2009 in Irish sport
2009 in British sport
2009 in poker
2010 in poker